Kalavathi is a 1951 Indian Tamil-language fantasy comedy film written and directed by L. S. Ramachandran based on a story by T. K. Sundara Vathiyar and Chidambaram A. M. Nataraja Kavi. The film stars T. S. Durairaj, T. A. Jayalakshmi and E. R. Sahadevan. It revolves around the dispute between two goddesses over who is superior, and a farmer who they use to determine the answer. The film was released on 23 February 1951.

Plot 

Saraswati is the goddess of knowledge and Lakshmi is the goddess of wealth. Both argue over who is superior, and use an illiterate farmer to determine the answer.

Cast 
 T. S. Durairaj as the farmer
 T. A. Jayalakshmi as the princess
 E. R. Sahadevan as the minister

Production 
Kalavathi was directed by L. S. Ramachandran who also wrote the screenplay based on a story by Chidambaram A. M. Nataraja Kavi and T. K. Sundara Vathiyar, and produced by Windsor Productions. Cinematography was handled by R. D. Mathur, and editing by N. P. Rathinam.

Soundtrack 
The soundtrack was composed by M. S. Gnanamani while the lyrics were written by T. K. Sundara Vathiyar, Chidambaram A. M. Nataraja Kavi and M. S. Subramaniam.

Release and reception 
Kalavathi was released on 23 February 1951. Randor Guy praised the film for "the interesting storyline and good performances by Durairaj, Jayalakshmi and Sahadevan".

References

External links 
 

1950s fantasy comedy films
1950s Tamil-language films
1951 films
Films scored by M. S. Gnanamani
Indian fantasy comedy films